

The HERASAF Project 

HERASAF is a well established open-source XACML 2.0 implementation.
It provides an extended implementation of the XACML 2.0 standard.
It is freely available, established and based on future driven technologies and standards.

References

External links 
HERASAF website
OASIS XACML committee website

Computer security software
XML-based standards
Computer access control